Jesse Borjon is an American politician and businessman serving as a member of the Kansas House of Representatives from the 52nd district. Elected in November 2020, he assumed office on January 11, 2021.

Early life and education 
Born and raised in Topeka, Kansas, Borjon earned a Bachelor of Arts degree in political science from Washburn University.

Career 
Prior to entering politics, Borjon owned a retail store and property management company. He also served as director of the Kansas Corporation Commission for public affairs and consumer protection. He also worked as a spokesperson for former Kansas Secretary of State Ron Thornburgh during the 2010 Kansas gubernatorial election.

References 

Living people
People from Topeka, Kansas
Washburn University alumni
Republican Party members of the Kansas House of Representatives
Politicians from Topeka, Kansas
21st-century American politicians
Year of birth missing (living people)